Manuel Jover (born 1960) is a French art critic and journalist.

He regularly publishes reviews in magazines and has edited issues of Connaissance des arts magazine. He also publishes a weekly article in La Croix.

Works 
  Le Christ dans l'art, Sauret, 1994 .
  Ingres, Pierre Terrail, 2005 .
  Ingres, Pierre Terrail, 2005 .
  Caravage, Pierre Terrail, 2006 .
  Courbet, Pierre Terrail, 2007 .
  Moi, Gustave Courbet. Un livre d'art et d'activités, Pierre Terrail, 2007 .
  (M. Naumovitz, translator.) Pandini peintre : Reliefs, L'Harmattan, 2007 .
  Reimpre, Fragments International, 2011 .

References

French male journalists
20th-century French journalists
21st-century French journalists
Living people
French art critics
1960 births
20th-century French male writers
21st-century French male writers
French columnists